This is a discography article of Canadian Christian music group Starfield.

Albums

Studio albums

Independent and compilation albums

Extended plays

Singles

Album appearances

Other appearances

Notes and references

External links 
 

Discographies of Canadian artists
Starfield
Starfield
Starfield